MMHS can refer to several things:

Machias Memorial High School
Manchester Memorial High School
Maple Mountain High School (Utah)
Mardela Middle and High School
Matthew Moss High School
Morton Memorial Schools, at the Indiana Soldiers' and Sailors' Children's Home
Mount Miguel High School
Military Message Handling System
Milliken Mills High School
Minto Memorial High School
Mira Mesa Senior High School
Mundy's Mill High School
Murdock Middle/High School
Murrieta Mesa High School